Justice Hecht may refer to:

Daryl Hecht (1952–2019), associate justice of the Iowa Supreme Court
Nathan Hecht (born 1949), chief justice of the Texas Supreme Court

See also 
Hecht (disambiguation)